The Old Bridge of Vilaller is an ancient bridge on the river Noguera Ribagorçana, currently in ruins. It is protected as a Bé Cultural d'Interès Local.

Description 
The bridge is a 17th-century construction that crosses the river Noguera Ribagorçana, linking the main center of Vilaller with the  neighbourhood of Aragon located on the right bank of the river.

The original bridge had three arches, but was damaged during the flood of 1963 and lost two of them.

History 
For many years the river was crossed by means of a lever located roughly where the bridge is situated. During the 16th century the village of Vilaller experienced a strong economic growth so that on August 15, 1686, the General Council of Vilaller petitioned to His Majesty Charles II of Spain the permission for building a stone three arched bridge where the lever had been until then. They engaged to build it and keep it.

The bridge endured until the flood of August 2, 1963, when the river destroyed two of the three arches.

For some time, makeshift wooden planks over the ruins of the bridge allowed crossing the river, until June 1964 when a new bridge was built upstream.

References 

Bridges in Catalonia